FC Duruji was a Georgian football club based in the Kakhetian town of Kvareli. 

The club took part in the top tier of Georgian football system in 1994/95 and 1995/96 seasons. Later Duruji competed in low leagues, including Meore Liga until 2017. 

Shortly after the relegation to Regionuli Liga the team ceased to exist.

Stadium
Duruji's home ground is considered unique given its location inside the medieval Kvareli Fortress.

Name
Duruji is a left tributary of Alazani river. It flows through Kvareli.

References

Football clubs in Georgia (country)
Liga 3 (Georgia)